is a Japanese tokusatsu drama. It is the 44th entry of Toei's long-running Super Sentai metaseries and the first series to air exclusively in the Reiwa era. Kiramagers main motifs are genies, gemstones and vehicles. It is the fifth vehicle-themed Super Sentai series and the first to use a genie and gemstone motif.

The show premiered on March 8, 2020, joining Kamen Rider Zero-One, and later, Kamen Rider Saber in the Super Hero Time line-up on TV Asahi affiliate stations. After its finale in 2021, it was succeeded by Kikai Sentai Zenkaiger.

Story

After planet Crystaria is invaded, Princess Mabushina takes the Kiramai Stones and seeks refuge on Earth to find individuals with strong "shining spirits", or Kiramental, to become the Kiramagers and fight off the threat of Yodonheim, an imperial army of darkness that now plans to invade Earth.

With help from Muryo Hakataminami, the founder of CARAT, a private organization created in preparation for Yodonheim's attack, Mabushina meets the passionate artist Juru Atsuta, the esports professional Tametomo Imizu, the prodigy athlete Sena Hayami, the famous actor Shiguru Oshikiri, and the talented surgeon Sayo Oharu, who accept the duty to protect Earth as the Kiramagers. The team later gains a sixth member: the treasure hunter Takamichi Crystaria, Muryo's long-lost older brother who was adopted into Mabushina's family after he became a human/Crystarian hybrid.

Episodes

Production
Mashin Sentai Kiramager was trademarked in September and officially announced on Christmas Day, 2019. The main cast was officially revealed on January 16, 2020.

Impact of the COVID-19 pandemic

On March 31, 2020, a press conference held by TV Asahi revealed that Rio Komiya, the actor playing Juru Atsuta, had tested positive for COVID-19. The production of Mashin Sentai Kiramager had stopped since the previous week. However, Toei announced that they had episodes filmed until May.

News also came out that Toei Studios shut down for disinfection in response. However, on April 3, Toei released a statement saying it was false, calling it misinformation. As of April 5, Komiya's health was improving and all of the series' staff, cast, and the veteran Super Sentai actors and actresses who supported his recovery were waiting for his speedy recovery and return to the set so they could continue filming. On April 9, Komiya had announced via his Twitter that he was officially discharged from the hospital, however, he would still remain in self-quarantine at home for at least two weeks.

The show was eventually put on hiatus after the airing of Episode 10 on May 10, with four specials and a televised version of Episode Zero airing in its place. With the state of emergency lifted on May 26, Toei resumed filming of the show on June 1, with Episode 11 airing on June 21. In regards to the summer movie, it was postponed alongside Kamen Rider Zero-One the Movie: Real×Time.

Films

Episode Zero
The movie was double billed with Kishiryu Sentai Ryusoulger VS Lupinranger VS Patranger the Movie, which featured a crossover between Ryusoulger and Kaitou Sentai Lupinranger VS Keisatsu Sentai Patranger. As the events of the film take place before the first episode of the series, the plot of the film mainly focuses on Mabushina's exodus to Earth and scouting people with Kiramental who can help her fend off the Yodonheim assassins sent after her. During the show's hiatus, an edited version of Episode Zero was aired on television on May 17, 2020 in lieu of a new episode.

Be-Bop Dream
 was scheduled for release in Japanese theaters on July 23, 2020, double billed with Kamen Rider Zero-One the Movie: Real×Time. However, both were postponed due to the COVID-19 pandemic. On August 30, 2020, it was announced that the film was rescheduled for release in Spring 2021. On December 6, 2020, it was announced that the film was released on February 20, 2021 as part of  alongside Kishiryu Sentai Ryusoulger Special: Memory of Soulmates and Kikai Sentai Zenkaiger the Movie: Red Battle! All Sentai Great Assemble!!. Mitsu Dan portrayed the film's main antagonist, Minjo. The events of the film take place between episodes 23 and 24 of the series. The film also includes a cameo of PPAP (Pen-Pineapple-Apple-Pen) performed by Daimaou Kosaka, who is also Muryo Hakataminami's actor in the series.

Special episodes
Following Rio Komiya's infection with COVID-19, production of the series was halted for a few weeks. In the meantime, these special episodes featuring old footage were released after a special airing of Episode Zero.
: A special that covers the first two episodes with deleted scenes.
: An Ametalk-style two-week variety show special with the Kiramai Stones talking about their battles and partners in the first ten episodes.
: A special that covers the Jamenshi they made to fight the Kiramagers in the first ten episodes.

V-Cinema

Kiramager vs. Ryusoulger
 is a V-Cinema release that features a crossover between Kiramager and Kishiryu Sentai Ryusoulger. The V-Cinema received a limited theatrical release on April 29, 2021, followed by its DVD and Blu-ray release on August 4, 2021. The events of the V-Cinema take place between episodes 26 and 27 of the series.

Ten Gokaiger

 is a V-Cinema release which received a limited theatrical release on November 12, 2021, followed by its DVD and Blu-ray release on March 9, 2022. The V-Cinema commemorates the 10th anniversary of Kaizoku Sentai Gokaiger and features an appearance by Kohei Shoji as Kiramager character Takamichi Crystaria.

Zenkaiger vs. Kiramager vs. Senpaiger
 is a V-Cinema release that features a crossover between Kiramager and Kikai Sentai Zenkaiger. The V-Cinema received a limited theatrical release on April 29, 2022, followed by its DVD and Blu-ray release on September 28, 2022. Additionally, Ryota Ozawa of Kaizoku Sentai Gokaiger and Asahi Ito of Kaitou Sentai Lupinranger VS Keisatsu Sentai Patranger reprised their respective roles as Captain Marvelous/Gokai Red and Kairi Yano/Lupin Red. The events of the V-Cinema take place after the final episode of Zenkaiger.

Web episodes

Mashin Folktale Theater
 is a web-exclusive animated short series released on Toei Tokusatsu YouTube Official.

Yodonna series
Yodonna is a web-exclusive series from Toei Tokusatsu Fan Club that focuses on the villain Yodonna. Nashiko Momotsuki, Mizuki Saiba, Rio Komiya, and Rui Kihara return to perform their roles from the main series. The events of the web-exclusive series take place after the final episode of the series and sees Yodonna possessing the Kiramagers' ally Mizuki Kakihara in an attempt to revive herself.
: The titular first entry of the web-exclusive series released on August 8, 2021.
: A sequel to the titular first entry of the web-exclusive series released on September 12, 2021.
: A sequel to the titular second entry of the web-exclusive series released on March 5, 2023.

Cast
: 
: 
: 
: 
: 
: 
: 
:

Voice actors
: 
: 
: 
: 
: 
: 
, Yodon Changer Voice: 
: 
: 
, Narration, Kiramager Equipment Voice:

Guest cast

: 
: 
Band members (24): , 
Temple Priest (25 & 26): 
: 
: 
: 
Ice pop seller (35): 
Rapper (36): 
 (40):  of comedy duo

Songs
Opening theme

Ending theme

From episodes 23 to 31, the following character songs replaced "Kiraful Miracle Kiramager" as the ending theme.
 performed by Mabushina (Inori Minase)
 performed by 
 performed by Juru Atsuta (Rio Komiya)
 performed by Tametomo Imizu (Rui Kihara)
"Winding Road" performed by Sena Hayami (Yume Shinjo)
"Perfect Blue" performed by Shiguru Oshikiri (Atomu Mizuishi)
 performed by Sayo Oharu (Mio Kudo)
 performed by Muryo Hakataminami (Daimaou Kosaka)
 performed by Takamichi Crystaria (Kohei Shoji).

Notes

References

External links
 at TV Asahi
 at Toei Company
 at Super-Sentai.net
 for Mashin Sentai Kiramager the Movie
 for Mashin Sentai Kiramager vs. Ryusoulger
 for Kikai Sentai Zenkaiger vs. Kiramager vs. Senpaiger

Super Sentai
2020 Japanese television series debuts
2021 Japanese television series endings
TV Asahi original programming
Genies in television
Japanese supernatural television series
Arabian mythology in popular culture
Persian mythology in popular culture
Indian mythology in popular culture
Television series based on Norse mythology
Television series based on Egyptian mythology
Television series based on multiple mythologies
Television productions suspended due to the COVID-19 pandemic